The Royal Oak Transit Center is an Amtrak station in Royal Oak, Michigan.

References

External links 

Royal Oak Amtrak Station (USA Rail Guide -- Train Web)

Amtrak stations in Michigan
Buildings and structures in Oakland County, Michigan
Transportation in Oakland County, Michigan